Ch Nadeem Khadim (born January 12, 1970 at Okara, Pakistan is a Pakistani politician and Member of the Pujab Assembly.

Biography 
He received his B.A from University of the Punjab, Lahore. He was elected as Member of the Provincial Assembly of the Punjab in the 2008 general elections. 

His father, Ch Khadim Hussain, also served for many years in the Punjab Assembly.

Reference 

Living people
1970 births
Pakistan Muslim League (N) politicians
Punjab MPAs 2008–2013
Punjab MPAs 2013–2018
People from Okara, Pakistan